The 6th North Carolina Regiment was one of ten regiments of the North Carolina Line of the Continental Army that fought in the American Revolution.

History
The 6th North Carolina Regiment existed as a Continental Army unit from North Carolina from 1776 to 1779. Key events in its history include:
 March 26, 1776, North Carolina began raising troops for service in the Continental Army, including troops in the Wilmington and Hillsborough military districts of North Carolina that would become the 6th North Carolina Regiment.
 April 15, 1776, 6th North Carolina Regiment authorized by the Continental Congress and placed under the Southern Department of the Continental Army under Major General Charles Lee.
 February 5, 1777, placed under the Northern Department of the Continental Army under Major General Philip Schuyler.
 July 8, 1777, assigned to the North Carolina Brigade of the Northern Department.
 May 29, 1778, 6th regiment folded into the 1st North Carolina Regiment by the Continental Congress due to low numbers of soldiers.
 February 1779, furloughed soldiers recalled to resurrect the 5th North Carolina Regiment, as well as the 6th North Carolina Regiment; became part of the Southern Department under Major General Benjamin Lincoln.
 Late 1779, 6th North Carolina Regiment is dissolved when the nine month service of soldiers expired, officers went on to serve in North Carolina militia units.

The regiment saw action at the Battle of Brandywine in Pennsylvania on September 11, 1777, Battle of Germantown in Pennsylvania on October 4, 1777, Battle of Brier Creek in Georgia on March 3, 1779, and Battle of Stono Ferry in South Carolina on June 20, 1779.

Officers
The field grade officers included
 Col. John Alexander Lillington (commander in 1776)
 Lt. Col. William Taylor
 Colonel Gideon Lamb (commander 1777-1781, also major and lieutenant colonel)
 Lt. Col. Archibald Lytle
 Maj. John Baptiste Ashe

All company grade officers were considered to be part of the North Carolina Militia vice Continental Army. Some enlisted men were on the Continental roll and others were on militia rolls.  The company grade officers and enlisted troops signed up for nine months of service at a time.  They were recruited from the Wilmington and Hillsborough Districts of North Carolina.  Captain Griffith John McRee became the namesake for the 1836 Union Fort McRee in Pensacola Florida.  Other known captains included:

 Andrew Armstrong
 John Baptist Ashe, also Major
 Francis Child
 Arthur Council
 Thomas Donoho
 George Dougherty
 William Glover
 John James
 Archibald Lytle
 Griffith John McRee (see Fort McRee)
 George Mitchell
 Benjamin Pike
 Jesse Saunders
 Philip Taylor
 Thomas White
 Daniel Williams

See also
 Departments of the Continental Army
 North Carolina Line

References

External links
 Bibliography of the Continental Army in North Carolina compiled by the United States Army Center of Military History
  Davis, Charles L.; A Brief History of the North Carolina Troops on the Continental Establishment in the War of the Revolution with a Register of Officers of the Same, published in 1896, Link, accessed Jan 30, 2019

North Carolina regiments of the Continental Army
Military units and formations established in 1776
Military units and formations disestablished in 1783